Tamara Apostolico (born 28 April 1989) is a former Italian discus thrower who was finalist at the 2012 European Championships

Her personal bests, 59.50 m set in 2012, at the end of the 2020 outdoor season is the 5th best all-time performance of the Italian lists and in that year it was also the 62nd best result in the world top-lists.

Achievements
Senior

National titles
Apostolico won a national championship at individual senior level.

Italian Athletics Championships
Discus throw: 2012

See also
 Italian all-time top lists - Discus throw

References

External links
 

1989 births
Living people
Italian female discus throwers
Athletics competitors of Fiamme Oro